Borrello is a surname. Notable people with the surname include:

 Brandon Borrello (born 1995), Australian footballer
 Brian Borrello, American artist
 Carlos Borrello (born 1955), Argentine football manager
 George Borrello (born 1967), American businessman and politician
 Giuseppe Borrello (1820–1894), Italian poet and patriot

See also
 Borello, surname
 Borrello Island, in Antarctica
 Laureana di Borrello, municipality in Calabria, Italy

Italian-language surnames